Atar Singh Rao is a leader of the Bahujan Samaj Party in Uttar Pradesh.

On 10 June 2016, he was elected to the Uttar Pradesh Legislative Council.

References 

Living people
Members of the Uttar Pradesh Legislative Council
Bahujan Samaj Party politicians from Uttar Pradesh
1967 births